Streptomyces niveus is a bacterium species from the genus of Streptomyces which has been isolated from soil in the United States. Streptomyces niveus produces the aminocoumarin antibiotic novobiocin and the compounds nivetetracyclate A and nivetetracyclate B.

See also 
 List of Streptomyces species

References

Further reading

External links
Type strain of Streptomyces niveus at BacDive – the Bacterial Diversity Metadatabase

niveus
Bacteria described in 1956